Doug Tyler is a political figure in the province of New Brunswick, Canada.

Tyler was a member of the Legislative Assembly of New Brunswick from the 1987 election until his defeat in the 1999 election.  He served in the cabinet from 1991 to 1999 overseeing various ministries, including a stint as Deputy Premier under Camille Thériault's leadership.

Tyler was campaign manager for Paul Duffie's unsuccessful bid for the New Brunswick Liberal Party leadership, campaign manager for the New Brunswick Liberals in the 2003 election, co-chair for the Liberal Party of Canada's campaign in New Brunswick in the 2004 federal election and co-campaign manager for the New Brunswick Liberals in the 2006 provincial election.

From 2004 to 2006 he served as chief of staff to New Brunswick MP Andy Scott in his role as Minister of Indian and Northern Affairs.  On September 20, 2006, Premier-designate of New Brunswick Shawn Graham appointed Tyler to chair his transition team.

In his first press conference as Premier, on October 3, 2006 Shawn Graham said the Doug Tyler was serving as his acting chief of staff.  He was replaced by former cabinet colleague Bernard Thériault who became Graham's first permanent chief of staff on October 30, 2006.  He has worked at the Saint John-based public relations firm Revolution Strategy.

References 

Living people
Members of the United Church of Canada
New Brunswick Liberal Association MLAs
Members of the Executive Council of New Brunswick
Deputy premiers of New Brunswick
Year of birth missing (living people)